Gibberula burnupi is a species of sea snail, a marine gastropod mollusk in the family Cystiscidae, the margin snails.

Description
The shell size varies between 4 mm and 5.2 mm

Distribution
This species is distributed in the Indian Ocean along Madagascar and South Africa.

References

 Dautzenberg, Ph. (1929). Contribution à l'étude de la faune de Madagascar: Mollusca marina testacea. Faune des colonies françaises, III(fasc. 4). Société d'Editions géographiques, maritimes et coloniales: Paris. 321–636, plates IV-VII pp. 
 Kilburn, R.N. & Rippey, E. (1982) Sea Shells of Southern Africa. Macmillan South Africa, Johannesburg, xi + 249 pp. page(s): 113
 Lussi M. & Smith G. (1998) Family Cystiscidae Stimpson, 1865. Revision of the family Cystiscidae in South Africa with the introduction of three genera and the description of eight new species. Malacologia Mostra Mondiale 27: 3–23. [October 1998] [
 Petit R.E. (2009) George Brettingham Sowerby, I, II & III: their conchological publications and molluscan taxa. Zootaxa 2189: 1–218.

Cystiscidae
Gastropods described in 1897